The following table show the Spain national football team's all-time international record.

Competition records

FIFA World Cup

 Champions   Runners-up   Third place   Fourth place

UEFA European Championship

UEFA Nations League

*Draws include knockout matches decided on penalty kicks.

FIFA Confederations Cup

Summer Olympics

*Denotes draws including knockout matches decided via penalty shoot-out.
**Since 1968, Spain has sent its under 23 national team.

Mediterranean Games

Source:

Head-to-head record

Last match updated was against Morocco on 6 December 2022. Goal difference used to determine placement if results totals of two opponents are identical.

Notes:
 (†) Defunct national teams

Combined predecessor and successor Records

Notes:
 (†) Defunct national teams

Opponents

Opponents against those who have never played

Spain had the problem of isolation under General Franco's dictatorship. “Europe ends at the Pyrenees” was the saying in those days.
Sweden, England, Brazil, Argentina, Italy, France and Germany had all played more than 700 internationals matches by 2001. Spain only 454 matches.
Only national football teams from Europe and these teams from other Confederations which had played in at least one FIFA World Cup.

See also
 Spain national football team results
 Spain national football team records and statistics
 Portugal-Spain football rivalry

Notes

References

head
National association football team all-time records
Spain national football team records and statistics